Undibacterium is a genus of Gram-negative, oxidase- and catalase-positive Betaproteobacteria in the Oxalobacteraceae family. Undibacterium bacteria occurs in  drinking water.

References

Burkholderiales
Bacteria genera